Craniofacial abnormalities are congenital musculoskeletal disorders which primarily affect the cranium and facial bones.

They are associated with the development of the pharyngeal arches. Approximately, 5% of the UK or USA population present with dentofacial deformities requiring Orthognathic surgery, jaw surgery, and Orthodontics, brace therapy, as a part of their definitive treatment.

Notable conditions
 Platybasia
 Arrhinia - absence of the nose
 Craniosynostosis - premature fusion of the cranial sutures
 Cyclopia - one eye
 Mobius syndrome - paralysis of the facial muscles

References

External links 

Congenital disorders of musculoskeletal system